The year 1924 in archaeology involved some significant events.

Explorations

Excavations

 February 12 - Howard Carter opens the sarcophagus of Tutankhamun. Two days later, he closes the tomb in protest against the actions of the Egyptian authorities.
 March 1 - Discovery and subsequent start of excavations at Glozel.
 Work at Dolní Věstonice in Moravia begins under direction of Karel Absolon.
 20-year project at Chichen Itza by the Carnegie Institution and Harvard University begins under direction of Sylvanus G. Morley.
 Excavations at Qatna by Robert du Mesnil du Buisson begin.
 Excavation of Indus Valley civilisation site at Mohenjo-daro by Kashinath Narayan Dikshit (following survey by M. S. Vats) begins.

Publications
 Francis Haverfield - The Roman Occupation of Britain, being six Ford Lectures (published posthumously).
 Alfred V. Kidder - An Introduction to the Study of Southwestern Archaeology.

Finds
The Beeston Tor Hoard, an Anglo-Saxon jewellery and coin hoard, discovered at Beeston Tor in Staffordshire, England.
Bab edh-Dhra discovered.

Awards

Miscellaneous
 Alexander Keiller purchases Windmill Hill, Avebury.
 Francis Llewellyn Griffith appointed first professor of Egyptology in the University of Oxford.
 Storms sweep away a portion of the Neolithic settlement at Skara Brae on Mainland, Orkney (Scotland).

Births
 Elisabeth Munksgaard, Danish prehistorian (died 1997)

Deaths
 June 14 - Jacques de Morgan, French archaeologist (born 1857)

References

Archaeology
Archaeology
Archaeology by year